

N'astirh

N'Garai

N'Kantu, the Living Mummy

Naga

Nahrees

Namor the Sub-Mariner

Namora

Namorita

Native

Nebula

Network

Sarah Vale
Sarah Vale is a fictional character, a technopathic mutant who appears in the Marvel Comics series New X-Men: Academy X as a student at the Xavier Institute for Higher Learning. The character, created by Nunzio DeFilippis and Christina Weir, first appeared in New X-Men: Academy X #12. She is the sister of fellow student Preview. One of the many mutants to lose their powers on M-Day, she is killed on a bus of depowered former Xavier Institute students that is destroyed by agents of William Stryker.

Valerie Martin
Valerie Martin is a fictional superhero with cybernetic body armor that grants Internet searching abilities. The character, created by Paul Jenkins and Ramon Bachs, first appeared in Civil War: Front Line #4 (September 2006). She was among the anti-Registration Act faction of heroes during the superhero civil war. She tries to use her powers to locate Captain America and the Secret Avengers in order to join them, but before she can she and the other members of her group are apprehended by S.H.I.E.L.D. Network is one of the 142 registered superheroes who are part of the 50-State Initiative.

Other versions of Network
A version of Network appears in the Ultimate Universe named Seth Vale, a former mutant prisoner of Camp: Angel who joins the resistance led by Kitty Pryde.

Network in other media
Network (Sarah Vale) appears in Wolverine and the X-Men, voiced by Grey DeLisle. In the episode "X-Calibre", she is shown on a ship to Genosha which is raided by Spiral and the Reavers. She helps keep the ship from sinking by communicating with it.

Neutron

Neutron (originally called Quasar) is a member of an alien race known as Stygians, and is a member of the Imperial Guard, a group of super-powered alien warriors who serve the ruler of the Shi'ar Empire. Created by Chris Claremont and Dave Cockrum, the character first appeared in X-Men #107 (October 1977). Quasar/Neutron's main power is to increase the mass, density or gravity of an object. He possesses superhuman strength, being able to lift seventy tons, as well as a high level of stamina and durability. In addition, he demonstrates the ability to siphon energy from constructs through physical contact, weakening them sufficiently that his strength can easily shatter them. (Like many original members of the Imperial Guard, Neutron is the analog of a character from DC Comics' Legion of Super-Heroes: in his case Star Boy.)

He is with the Imperial Guard the first time they fight the X-Men. He is a traitor who serves Lord Samedar, Deathbird, and the Brood in their conspiracy to overthrow Shi'ar Princess-Majestrix Lilandra Neramani. After defeating the Brood and the renegades, Lilandra resumes her position as the head of the Shi'ar Empire. Despite most of the Imperial Guard having joined with Deathbird against Lilandra, the team members are pardoned for their actions.

The character is renamed Neutron in Quasar #33 (April 1992).

Neutron, Warstar, Hussar and Webwing are later sent to Earth, however, for their crimes; Earth has been designated an interstellar prison as part of the 2001 "Maximum Security" crossover event.

Vulcan, the murderous brother of the X-Men leader Cyclops, attempts to gain power in Shi'ar space. The Guard is sent to stop him. Vulcan kills Guardsmen Cosmo and Smasher — and seemingly Impulse, Titan, and Neutron.

He survives, however, and in War of Kings is still on Earth, coming into conflict with Jean Grey and other X-Men. Following this battle, Warstar, Hussar, and Neutron return to active duty with the Guard. A being who resembles Neutron is shown during the War of Kings, serving Vulcan.

Other versions of Neutron
Neutron appears with other members of the Imperial Guard in Last Planet Standing #1 (July 2006).

Neutron in other media
Neutron appears as a mini-boss in Marvel: Ultimate Alliance, voiced by James Sie. He fights the heroes alongside Hussar on board a Shi'ar warship after Deathbird had overthrown Lilandra Neramani.

Nezarr the Calculator
Nezarr the Calculator is a Celestial who is a mathematician and possesses the ability to project illusions.

NFL SuperPro

Night Nurse

Linda Carter

Georgia Jenkins

Christine Palmer

Night Thrasher

Dwayne Taylor

Donyell Taylor

Night Thrasher (Donyell Taylor), also known as Bandit, is a fictional character from Marvel Comics. He first appeared in Night Thrasher (vol. 2) #3 (October 1993), and was created by Fabian Nicieza and Ken Lashley. Donyell is the older half-brother of Dwayne Michael Taylor, the original Night Thrasher.

Donyell Taylor is the product of a one-night stand between his unnamed mother and Daryl Taylor, father of Dwayne Taylor. Daryl Taylor was a rich business man who had turned the inheritance from the deaths of his parents into a hundred times the amount he was given. With it he set up charitable foundations like the Taylor Foundation. Daryl had been married to Dwayne's mother Melody since they were 18 years old. Daryl met Donyell's mother while at the bar in the Fairmont Hotel in Chicago. Daryl paid Donyell's mother a check worth six figures to keep quiet of their affair after she revealed she was pregnant. Donyell resented Dwayne for having the money and the family he never had. Dwayne resented the notion that his life was somehow any better because he barely remembered his parents, who were murdered by Silhouette's father Andrew Chord.

Donyell took the name Bandit and began targeting Night Thrasher's old foes to prove he was superior to Dwayne. Dwayne would later endure a severe beating at Bandit's hands. Later wanting a rematch, Bandit abducts Silhouette keeping her tied to a chair under blinding lights in order to lure Dwayne into a confrontation, but Dwayne wins the rematch. Donyell begins sleeping with Silhouette soon afterwards. When Night Thrasher, Silhouette, and various other members of the New Warriors are sent back in time Donyell joins Hindsight Lad, Sprocket, and his father's killer Andrew Chord in creating a new team of New Warriors to save the originals. The team consisted of Bandit, Hindsight Lad, Turbo, Darkhawk, Dagger, and Powerpax. Donyell later comes to terms with his half-brother, finding common ground during their battle against the Sphinx when the Warriors were returned to the proper time period.

Donyell and Silhouette quit the New Warriors soon after and moved to Chicago. This was the last time that they were seen for several years. The next time Donyell shows up, he has apparently been seeing Gambit's ex-wife Belladonna for a few months. No one knows what exactly happened between Silhouette and Bandit in Chicago that caused them to separate. It is clear by their conversation at Dwayne's grave site that they are no longer a couple.

After the Stamford accident, Donyell Taylor had taken over the Taylor Foundation at the death of his half-brother. It is also revealed that Donyell suffered from a car accident that caused his legs to be amputated. Donyell denies involvement in the latest incarnation of the New Warriors. However, he reveals that a large amount of money was drained from the Taylor Foundation against his wishes and only he and his brother Dwayne had access to those accounts.

Later it is revealed that Donyell Taylor did not, in fact, lose his legs at all. The last panel shows him standing up and staring out of a window, with the image of Night Thrasher behind him, suggesting that he took his brother's alias and costume, and now leads the New Warriors. Apparently, Dwayne and Donyell reconciled at some point, as he is seen expressing regret for the earlier hostility in their relationship at Dwayne's grave.

Donyell considered disbanding the New Warriors after teammate Longstrike was murdered by one of the members of the new Zodiac. The remaining members convince him not to. Donyell has problems with Wondra sowing seeds of dissent among the rest of the group. Donyell frequently disappears during battles and does not divulge his comings and goings with his teammates. He downloaded information from Machinesmith, who he claimed was creating a techno-organic virus.

It is revealed that Donyell has taken in abused children and teenagers such as Kaz, Aja, and Grace to help him by making them members of the New Warriors support staff. They have helped in turning one of Arcade's former hideouts into a base for the team. He rescued each of them from abusive environments and has been trying to give them a new life.

When the Skrulls invade Earth, Donyell begins to wonder if the Night Thrasher that perished in Stamford was actually a Skrull. He travels to one of the New Warriors old safe houses, hoping to acquire a sample of his brother's DNA. Justice and his Counter Initiative arrive, and attack Donyell, believing him to be a Skrull impostor. They ask him if he is or is not Dwayne, which he doesn't answer, which just escalates things. The rest of the New Warriors then arrive on the scene.

A battle occurs between the two teams, but is quickly stopped by Donyell, who then shocks both groups by revealing his identity. They call a truce after Donyell asks Justice to help him find Dwayne's body. They arrive at a S.H.I.E.L.D. Helicarrier where Justice believe it is being held, only to find it under siege by a Skrull assault force. While the Warriors and the Counter Initiative battle the Skrulls and evacuate the surviving S.H.I.E.L.D. agents, Donyell and Justice find Dwayne's corpse, along with the remains of Microbe and Namorita. Donyell takes a sample of Dwayne's DNA and runs it through his armor's computer, then does the same with Microbe and Namorita. The results test positive and Donyell tells Justice that they're taking the bodies with them. Justice agrees and the two teams depart as Army reinforcements arrive to deal with the remaining Skrulls. Later, the two teams bury the remains of their friends in a short memorial service and part on good terms.

Following a confrontation with S.H.I.E.L.D.'s "capekillers", Skybolt and Ripcord are killed, and Donyell revealed that he had been working on a time machine, so that he could save the former New Warriors from their deaths in Stamford, and by extension, the New Warriors who had perished since then. When the machine is activated, it instead sends the New Warriors into a future where Iron Man has taken the Registration Act to the extreme, a future where all superpowered beings have been removed from the general populace, and the people are under a rule of tyranny. Confronting Iron Man, Donyell discovers that it is not Tony Stark in the suit, but Dwayne, returned from the dead. Despite having misgivings about Dwayne's totalitarian rule, Donyell's need to reconnect with his brother leads him to betray and capture the other New Warriors. However, after Dwayne kills Tony Stark (who in this timeline had taken on the identity of Night Thrasher) in cold blood, Donyell comes to his senses, rescuing the others and freeing the incarcerated superheroes. Donyell is then attacked by Dwayne, and is forced to kill him. Upon their return to the present, Donyell disbands the New Warriors, believing they will never be able to trust him again.

Later, a man with a Night Thrasher outfit appears among the Counter Force members that arrive at Camp Hammond during the assault of the Thor clone called Ragnarok. He is later confirmed to be Donyell Taylor, who becomes the group's benefactor (and second in command) when the group goes on the run from Norman Osborn, changing the group name to "Avengers Resistance". When the Avengers Resistance aids the seceding Heavy Hitters against a group of other Initiative teams, Donyell is shot in the head by Taskmaster. He survives, and is captured by Osborn and the Hood, who make an offer to bring his brother back. However, the Avengers Resistance comes to rescue him.

While Counter Force moves to a new hideout, Donyell stays behind now that Norman Osborn knows who he is.

Counter Force hears about the incident at Soldier Field involving Volstagg and the U-Foes. Justice deduces that Norman Osborn orchestrated this. While Counter Force contacts the Mighty Avengers and the New Avengers, Donyell is advised to send e-mails containing evidence of the U-Foes' payoffs, which Donyell objected stating that Norman Osborn would make up some excuse to cover it. Justice concludes that they will have to attack Camp H.A.M.M.E.R. to expose Norman Osborn for what he is.

When visiting his brother's grave, Donyell is conflicted if he should go with the deal Norman Osborn and the Hood gave him. Counter Force takes the fight to Camp H.A.M.M.E.R. and ends up fighting the Hood's gang. They are knocked down by the Hood's new Asgardian weaponry. When Donyell arrives, the Hood gives him an opportunity to prove himself by killing Tigra.

The Hood demands that Donyell kill Tigra if he wants his brother revived. Instead, Donyell attacks the Hood and is joined by Tigra as the Hood uses the Norn Stones to empower some of the cadets on his side.

Powers and abilities of Donyell Taylor
Bandit is a mutant with bioelectrical powers similar to an electric eel that require physical contact and a conductive medium to work. He can channel an electrical charge strong enough to stun, injure, or kill through someone just by touching them. He augments the range of this power by shooting special wire-tethered quarrels from his wristbow. He has also demonstrated superhuman speed and reflexes on par with Midnight's Fire and Silhouette. Donyell is an accomplished marksman, acrobat, and martial artist.

Bandit carries a specialized wrist mounted crossbow, that fires wire-tethered quarrels tipped with miniature grappling barbs which would penetrate an opponent's flesh and then open up beneath the skin. He then uses his powers to send a debilitating bio-electric charge along the electrically conductive tether, basically making himself a living taser. He also carries a variety of throwing stars.

His Night Thrasher armor, apart from giving him added protection, enables him to project form-energy weapons, such as a bo staff, escrima sticks, and wrist blades. At one point he banged the sticks together to create an energy shockwave.
He also displayed a jet pack and used Pym Particles to shrink himself and others down.

Donyell is an accomplished thief and scientist, it is revealed in New Warriors (vol. 4), that he was able to empower de-powered mutants by stealing powerful technology from the likes of the Avengers. The full capabilities of this knowledge are unknown, but he is feasibly capable of producing incredibly powerful enhancing technology/exoskeletons.

Other versions of Donyell Taylor
An alternate version of Donyell was revealed in What If...? (vol. 2) #81, living in the Age of Apocalypse. When that world got attacked by Galactus, Bandit was killed in battle. One of the main features of the story was the fact that Donyell and his brother Night Thrasher were more reconciled emotionally than they are in the 616 universe.

Nightcrawler

Nighthawk

Kyle Richmond

Joaquin Pennyworth

Neil Richmond

Jack Norris

Tilda Johnson

Nightmare

Nightmask

Keith Remsen

Izanami Randall and Trull

Adam Blackveil

Nightshade

Nightside

Nightside (originally code-named Nightshade) is a member of the Shi'ar Imperial Guard. Created by Chris Claremont and Dave Cockrum, the character first appeared in X-Men #107 (October 1977). The character can tap into the Darkforce dimension, giving her the ability to conjure absolute darkness within a radius around her or her enemies. She can displace projectile attacks against her person by opening small apertures into the Darkforce.

The character is present when the Shi'ar Empire comes into conflict with the X-Men regarding the Phoenix entity, with the Guard battling them at the command of Emperor D'Ken and his sister, the Grand Admiral, Princess Lilandra Neramani.

Later, a renegade faction of the Imperial Guard become traitors, deciding to serve Lord Samédàr, Deathbird, and the Brood in their conspiracy to overthrow Shi'ar Princess-Majestrix Lilandra. Nightside is one of the faction of the Guard that remains loyal to Lilandra and, with the X-Men's help, battles the renegades.

After many further adventures with the Imperial Guard, Nightside is killed in battle with the Kree. Some time later, she is replaced from the ranks of the Subguardians by Nightside II.

Like many original members of the Imperial Guard, Nightside is the analog of a character from DC Comics' Legion of Super-Heroes: in her case Shadow Lass.

Nightwatch

Nikki

Emil Nikos
Emil Nikos is a fictional character appearing in American comic books published by Marvel Comics. Created by Roy Thomas and Gil Kane, he first appeared in The Amazing Spider-Man #102 (November 1971).

Fictional character biography 
Emil Nikos was the best friend of Michael Morbius, who grew up with him and went to university together, majoring in biochemistry. Emil dedicated his life to seeking the cure to Michael's rare blood disease and they won the Nobel Prize in Biology for their efforts. When the experiment failed, turning Michael into "The Living Vampire," Emil was the first victim of Morbius' bloodlust. His body was discovered by Martine Bancroft, and he was transformed into a vampire by Baron Blood.

Powers and abilities 
Emil possessed the typical powers associated with vampires.

Emil Nikos in other media 
A variation of the character renamed Emil Nicholas appears in the live-action Sony's Spider-Man Universe film Morbius, portrayed by Jared Harris. This version is the surrogate father of the title character and Lucien "Milo" Crown and a renowned scientist based in Greece. He is killed by a now-vampire Milo.

Tana Nile

Nimrod

Nitro

Kiden Nixon

No-Girl
No-Girl, or Martha Johansson, is a fictional mutant character, an isolated brain. The character was created by Grant Morrison and Ethan Van Sciver and first appeared in New X-Men #118.

A runaway, she was captured by the U-Men, and their founder John Sublime had her brain removed from her body and kept it alive in a capsule. Sublime controls her through drugs and uses her to telepathically subdue his opponents, the two X-Men Cyclops and Emma Frost. Emma eventually freed herself and Cyclops from Martha's psionic control, inadvertently allowing Martha to take revenge on Sublime by telepathically forcing him to fall to his death.

She later becomes a student in the Xavier Institute's Special Class. Quentin Quire invents a special hovering case to hold her brain, allowing her a level of mobility.

When Xorn destroys the school and forms a new Brotherhood of Mutants under the guise of Magneto, Martha is among those who join. However, Martha's loyalty does not last; she accurately predicts that Xorn's scheme to murder every human in Manhattan and turn the planet upside down will fail. Following Xorn's death, Martha returns to the X-Mansion, appearing infrequently as part of the student body.

After the X-Men abandon the X-Mansion and relocate to San Francisco, Beast finds Martha in his old lab and retrieves her from the ruined Xavier Institute in a carrying case, bringing her to the new headquarters.

Martha is later featured in a one-shot story entitled "Martha Johansson vs. Quentin Quire: 7½." Now relocated to the mutant safe haven of Utopia, Martha finds herself the appointed "arch-nemesis" for a newly revived Quentin Quire. Finding life on a higher plane to be "boring," Quentin revives himself and decides to become a villain and secretly destroy Utopia, claiming that the X-Men stole his idea to create a mutant nation. Making a game of his master plan, he gives Martha seven and a half minutes to attempt to stop him. Martha attempts to alert the X-Men and locate Quentin, but he manages to intercept and taunt her at each attempt, ultimately smashing her container and leaving her to die. Martha realizes that Quentin has infiltrated Cerebra to destroy the island and take revenge on the Cuckoos by trapping them in a mental loop. Martha outsmarts Quentin's plans by using her powers to tip off the Cuckoo Celeste to an error in Quentin's mental loop. The Cuckoos are then able to break free and quickly defeat him. They send help for Martha and thank her for saving them. Martha reflects on the experience, finding that she enjoyed it, and contemplates the possibility of taking up superheroism.

During the separation between the X-Men in two teams, Martha choose to stay at Utopia. At the request of Zero, she joins the Lights of Hope Summers. Through the use of Zero's techno-organic powers, Martha has received a new physical body very similar to Zero's, with her front lobe exposed. She has subsequently been seen sharing Zero's bed, though whether this is a depiction of intimacy or merely the only practical way for her to keep her new body is undetermined.
During Zero's rampage on Utopia, Martha and Hope work together stopping him and sacrificing her new body in the process, but Hope saves her and she is back in a new brain canister. It is revealed that Martha's powers could negate Zero's with ease.

After Wolverine's death, one of his last requests was for Spider-Man to join the Jean Grey School as a teacher for the Special Class so that he could identify a mole that Wolverine believed was among the student body. While Martha was one of the suspects, Spider-Man came to trust her while Martha respected him as a teacher, helping to shield his mind from an attempted telepathic probe by Rachel Summers and later protecting his conscious mind when he was forced to take on a new symbiote to stop a symbiote invasion of a S.W.O.R.D. satellite. It was eventually revealed that the mole was Ernst, who had been working with Mister Sinister to provide him with DNA samples of the X-Men in exchange for him giving Martha a new body. However, when the time came for Sinister to uphold his end of the bargain, he just placed Martha in a clone of Storm's body rather than recreating her old one, prompting Martha to reject this offer and convincing Ernst to remove her from the clone. Once Sinister was defeated, Martha apparently began dating Eye-Guy, whose new perceptions had expanded to a point where he claimed that he could even 'see' Martha 'smile' if he looked at her the right way.

Martha is a telepath, able to communicate mentally and manipulate the minds of other beings. In her introduction as an isolated brain Martha uses her telepathy to communicate through others near her, but typically only directs her telepathic speech to her classmate Ernst, who then repeats her comments to others. She is able to telepathically override and control the motor functions of others. This allows her to temporarily negate the powers of other mutants, though she must be at close range to do so. She can also project her consciousness into the minds of others, taking complete possession of their bodies while leaving her brain unconscious and vulnerable.

Martha can broadcast disruptive psionic distortion (called "psycho-chaff") into her immediate environment that clouds the minds of others, inhibiting their concentration and autonomic nervous functions to the point of stupor. Her abilities in this area are shown to be strong enough to overpower the subconscious defenses of Emma Frost when Emma was in her diamond form and unable to access her own telepathy. However, Martha's "psycho-chaff" is not strong enough to bypass Emma Frost's conscious telepathic abilities, as Emma was able to easily overpower Martha and regain control of her motor functions after shifting out of her diamond form and regaining her telepathy.

Without a body, Martha is limited in all other areas. She, as a brain, travels in a fluid-filled jar with technology (invented by fellow Xavier Institute student Quentin Quire) that allows it to float, and is anchored via a metal chain. The floats offer her some level of mobility, moving in the direction of her choosing.

It was also stated that, in her original body, Martha's blood had luminescent properties; Martha wrote a note to her parents using her own glowing blood when she ran away from home.

It is unknown if Martha had Zero's powers in the body he created for her, but it seems she was dependent on Zero's concentration for her form to be maintained.

Other versions of No-Girl
 In the Age of X reality, Martha Johansson was shown incarcerated in Fortress X's X-Brig as part of the 'Moira' personality's attempt to prevent telepaths exposing her manipulation of reality.
 Johansson is present in the alternate future Here Comes Tomorrow, set some 150 years from the present. She is still close friends with Ernst, who is revealed to be a benevolent reincarnation of Cassandra Nova. Along with Nova, she stands alongside Wolverine, E.V.A., the Three-In-One, and Beak's Grandson Tito Jerome Bohusk against a Sublime-possessed version of the X-Man Beast, who prematurely revives Jean Grey in order to control her and the Phoenix Force.
In Chris Claremont's X-Men: The End storyline, which takes place some 20 years ahead of standard X-Men continuity, Martha Johansson has taken on the role of Cerebra.

No-Name

Nocturne

Talia Wagner

Nomad

Steve Rogers

Edward Ferbel

Jack Monroe

Rikki Barnes

Ian Rogers

Dakota North

Northstar

Nova

Frankie Raye

Richard Rider

Sam Alexander

Cassandra Nova

Nth Man

Nuke

Albert Gaines
Nuke is a fictional superhero appearing in American comic books published by Marvel Comics. The character is depicted as a member of the alternate-reality Squadron Supreme. Another version of the character appears in the title Supreme Power.

Squadron Supreme
Albert was a nuclear plant worker when he accidentally gained his superhuman powers. He became Nuke, an adventurer and member of the Squadron Supreme, and a super-powered hero who kept his identity a secret from even his own family.

Alongside the other Squadron members, he became mind-controlled by the Over-Mind. He was used along with the other members as pawns in the Over-Mind's conquest of "Other-Earth," until he was freed by the Defenders. He battled and defeated the Over-Mind and Null the Living Darkness alongside the Squadron and the Defenders.

Alongside the Squadron Supreme, Nuke assumes control of the United States government, and publicly reveals his true identity. Nuke then discovers out that his parents were dying from radiation poisoning, brought on by exposure to his own powers. Nuke turned to Tom Thumb to help find a cure; when Tom cannot and his parents die, a grief-stricken Nuke vows revenge and goes on a rampage. Doctor Spectrum restrains him by encasing him in an energy bubble construct, but Nuke's powers burn up the oxygen supply inside the bubble and he suffocates.

Albert Gaines was imbued with superhuman powers as a result of mutation through exposure to radioactive waste products, giving him immunity to the effects of radiation and the ability to generate nuclear energy within his body, which he can mentally manipulate to project destructive bursts. This has the side effect of him continually giving off low-level radiation. Towards the end of his life, Nuke also wears an air-conditioned radiation containment suit equipped with a radiometer to measure his radiation output, designed by Tom Thumb. Nuke is a fair hand-to-hand combatant, and received coaching from Nighthawk. Nuke suffers from emotional and psychological instability that culminates to insanity.

Supreme Power
Nuke is introduced as Mr. Al Gaines, a young, severely depressed man living underground in a fallout shelter alone because his body emits high levels of radiation he cannot control. He is near invulnerable, can fly, and apparently superhumanly strong. General Alexander offers him a suit that will control his radiation output in return for fighting Hyperion, whom General Alexander directs the blame for his condition.

In a fight with Hyperion the combination of Hyperion's eye-beams, Nuke's radiation blast, and Arcanna Jones' quantum alterations creates a brief and unexplainable skip in reality that sends Gaines, Jones, Dr. Emil Burbank and Raleigh Lund two years into the future. In this alternate future it is mentioned that Doctor Spectrum killed him at some point.

Nuke joins the government's Squadron Supreme. During a session in which all the Squadron members are asked to fill out information about themselves, Nuke's parents are revealed deceased. In the first mission he is high up in the sky to be used as a tactical nuke, the person of last resort.

Nuke in other media
Nuke appears in Avengers Assemble, voiced by Phil LaMarr. This version is an alien and a member of the Squadron Supreme. In the episode "Avengers' Last Stand", the Avengers raid the Squadron's citadel and discover it is draining energy from the Earth's core in order to restore Nuke, who destroys the citadel and reunites with his leader, Nighthawk. In "Avengers Underground", Iron Man, Thor, and Falcon trap Zarda and Nuke in the same prison box. As part of his contingency plan however, Nighthawk teleports Nuke and Hyperion to his tower, where Hyperion absorbs Nuke's power to help him destroy the Earth. Ultimately, the Avengers foil Nighthawk's plans and remand all of the Squadron Supreme to the Vault.

Frank Simpson

Nuklo

Numinus
Numinus is a cosmic entity claiming to be the guiding spirit of the Universe.

Nyx

Nyx was created by Al Ewing, Jim Zub, Mark Waid and Joshua James Shaw, based on the primordial goddess of darkness of the same name and first appeared in Avengers: No Road Home #1 and making her last appearance in Avengers: No Road Home #10. She's not to be confused with Nox, based on the same goddess, who was revealed to be a usurper.

References

Marvel Comics characters: N, List of